Bergara is a town and municipality located in the province of Gipuzkoa, in the autonomous community of Basque Country, in the north of Spain.

An Enlightened center of education operated by the Real Sociedad Bascongada de Amigos del País ("Royal Basque Society of Friends of the Country"), it was the place where brothers Juan José and Fausto Elhuyar discovered wolfram.

During the Carlist Wars, it operated as the capital and royal court of the Carlists. It was there where the agreement symbolized in the Vergara Embrace between Rafael Maroto and Baldomero Espartero, Prince of Vergara ended one of the period wars.

References

External links
Official Website 
Bernardo Estornés Lasa - Auñamendi Encyclopedia (Euskomedia Fundazioa) 
Laboratorium Bergara - European Physical Society Historic Site

Municipalities in Gipuzkoa